Æthelwulf of Berkshire (before 825 – 4 January, 871) was a Saxon ealdorman.  In 860 he and other men of Berkshire fought off a band of pirates near Winchester, Hampshire.  Later he mustered a force of 1400 men against an army of Danes, won the 31 December 870 Battle of Englefield on behalf of the then kingdom of Wessex. He received a land grant in 843/44 from Brihtwulf, king of Mercia; and lost his life at the Battle of Reading.

Æthelweard, in his account of the battle, reveals a curious fact about Æthelwulf, master of the art of the ambush: he was a Mercian and not a West Saxon. Not only this, Æthelweard says:

"In fact, the body of the dux (leader) mentioned above was carried away secretly and taken into Mercia to the place called Northworthig, but Derby in the Danish tongue."

References

External links 
 

871 deaths
Anglo-Saxon people
Anglo-Saxon warriors
9th-century English people
Year of birth uncertain